Nika Arih (born 19 October 1998) is a Slovenian badminton player.

Achievements

European Junior Championships 
Mixed doubles

BWF International Challenge/Series (3 runners-up) 
Women's doubles

Mixed doubles

  BWF International Challenge tournament
  BWF International Series tournament
  BWF Future Series tournament

References

External links 
 

1998 births
Living people
Slovenian female badminton players
Competitors at the 2022 Mediterranean Games
Mediterranean Games competitors for Slovenia
21st-century Slovenian women